Tibor Magyar (born February 27, 1941) is a Hungarian former footballer who played as a midfielder.

Career 
Magyar played in the North American Soccer League with Houston Stars in 1968. In his debut season with Houston he appeared in 25 matches and recorded one goal. In early 1969, he played in the Greater Los Angeles Soccer League with Phoenix Club. For the remainder of the 1969 season he played in Canada with Toronto Hungaria in the National Soccer League. In 1970, he played in the San Francisco Soccer Football League with Hakoah A.C.. 

In 1971, he returned to the NSL to play with London German Canadians. He later settled in the San Francisco Bay Area, and played in the Northern California Soccer League with the Oakland Rams in 1972. In his debut season with Oakland he assisted in securing the championship. The following season he served as a player-coach for Oakland.

References 
 

Living people
1941 births
Association football midfielders
Hungarian football managers
Hungarian footballers
Houston Stars players
North American Soccer League (1968–1984) players
Canadian National Soccer League players
San Francisco Soccer Football League players
Footballers from Budapest